Pavel Pashevich (born 4 June 2001) is a Belarusian professional footballer who plays for Energetik-BGU Minsk on loan from BATE Borisov.

Honours
Gomel
Belarusian Cup winner: 2021–22

References

External links 
 
 

2001 births
Living people
People from Barysaw
Sportspeople from Minsk Region
Belarusian footballers
Association football defenders
FC BATE Borisov players
FC Gorodeya players
FC Gomel players
FC Arsenal Dzerzhinsk players
FC Energetik-BGU Minsk players